Jan Zaprudnik (Belarusian: Янка Запруднік / Janka Zaprudnik, real name Siarhej Vilčycki Сяргей Вільчыцкі; 9 August 1926 – 26 May 2022) was a Belarusian-American historian and publicist. He was also one of the leaders of the Belarusian community in the United States and an honoured member of the Belarusian PEN-centre.

Biography
Jan Zaprudnik was born into a family of school teachers in what was then the Second Polish Republic. During the Occupation of Belarus by Nazi Germany, Zaprudnik graduated from the Gymnasium in Baranavičy and studied at a high school there.

In 1944, Jan Zaprudnik fled to Germany because of his likely persecution for collaboration with invaders by Soviet authorities. 

In 1954, he graduated from the history faculty of the Catholic University of Leuven in Belgium. Later he worked for the Belarusian service of Radio Free Europe.

In 1957, Jan Zaprudnik moved to the United States and was a member of the Rada of the Belarusian Democratic Republic working "to ensure that the world did not forget about the Belarusians and their right to their own independent state".

In 1969, he received a doctorate in history from New York University about Belarusian representatives in the State Duma of the Russian Empire at the beginning of the 20th century and later worked as a professor in history at several universities.

Works
Jan Zaprudnik started his publishing in 1947. During his life, he was  a correspondent and an editor of many periodicals of the Belarusian diaspora, including the English-language Journal of Belarusian Studies.

Main works in English are:
Belarus: At a Crossroads in History (1993)
Historical Dictionary of Belarus (1998)

Recognition 
Zaprudnik was awarded a Belarusian Democratic Republic 100th Jubilee Medal.

References

External links
Biography at 
BELARUS IN WORLD WAR II: COLLABORATIONISTS AND PARTISANS - interview for Radio Free Europe
Палітычнае змаганне за Беларусь у царскіх Дзяржаўных думах (1906-1917 гг.) // ARCHE. 2009. № 1/2. С. 43-217.

1926 births
2022 deaths
People from Karelichy District
20th-century American historians
Belarusian emigrants to the United States
Belarusian male writers
Catholic University of Leuven (1834–1968) alumni
New York University alumni
Columbia University staff
Radio Free Europe/Radio Liberty people
People from Mir, Belarus
American male non-fiction writers
Members of the Rada of the Belarusian Democratic Republic
American people of Belarusian descent